Dominick Alexander Guinn (born April 20, 1975) is an American professional boxer. He is self-managed and he is trained by Ronnie Shields and Alexander Gutierrez. He stands at 6'3" tall.

Known as the "Southern Disaster", he currently resides in Houston, Texas.

Amateur career
Born in Hot Springs, Arkansas, Guinn began boxing at age nine and lost in the quarterfinals in the Michigan Junior Olympic Tournament at 139 pounds. Fighting in the 147-pound class at 15 years of age, Guinn lost in the finals. Guinn won the 19-and-under Junior World title in 1993.

Guinn had an amateur career record of 290-26, twice winning the National Golden Gloves Super Heavyweight Championship in 1997 and 1999 but losing in the Olympic qualification to Calvin Brock. In 1998, Guinn won the U.S. National Championships and won a Bronze Medal at the Goodwill Games in New York City.

Professional career
He began his career winning his first 24 fights, including a seventh-round knockout win over Michael Grant and a victory over Duncan Dokiwari.

In 2004 he lost his first fight, a lackluster, but controversial decision to Monte Barrett. He knocked out veteran Phil Jackson but then lost his second fight to Sergei Liakhovich, who went on to win the WBO heavyweight title.

In 2005 he drew with Friday Ahunanya and lost to James Toney. In 2006, he defeated once-beaten British southpaw and Olympic Gold medalist Audley Harrison at the Agua Caliente casino, but lost his next fight against another southpaw Tony Thompson. In 2007 he continued his slide with losses against unbeaten Eddie Chambers in May and Robert Hawkins in December.

In October 2008, Guinn knocked out heavyweight prospect Jean François Bergeron in the second round. In 2009, Guinn knocked out unbeaten Johnnie White (21-0) in a first-round knockout to move back into contendership status and recently defeated Charles Davis by decision.

He has never been beaten inside the distance in his professional career.

Professional boxing record

|-
| align="center" style="border-style: none none solid solid; background: #e3e3e3"|Result
| align="center" style="border-style: none none solid solid; background: #e3e3e3"|Record
| align="center" style="border-style: none none solid solid; background: #e3e3e3"|Opponent
| align="center" style="border-style: none none solid solid; background: #e3e3e3"|Type
| align="center" style="border-style: none none solid solid; background: #e3e3e3"|Round
| align="center" style="border-style: none none solid solid; background: #e3e3e3"|Date
| align="center" style="border-style: none none solid solid; background: #e3e3e3"|Location
| align="center" style="border-style: none none solid solid; background: #e3e3e3"|Notes
|- align=center
|Loss
|35-12-1
|align=left| Artur Szpilka
|UD
|10
|
|align=left| 
|
|- align=center
|Loss
|35-11-1
|align=left| Hughie Fury
|PTS
|10
|
|align=left|
|align=left|
|-align=center
|Win
|35-10-1
|align=left| Donnie Davis
|KO
|1 
|
|align=left| 
|align=left|
|-align=center
|Loss
|34-10-1
|align=left| Tomasz Adamek
|UD
|10
|
|align=left| 
|align=left|
|-align=center
|Win
|34-9-1
|align=left| Stacy Frazier
|KO
|1 
|
|align=left| 
|align=left|
|-align=center
|Loss
|33-9-1
|align=left| Denis Boytsov
|UD
|10
|
|align=left| 
|align=left|
|-align=center
|Loss
|33-8-1
|align=left| Amir Mansour
|UD
|10
|
|align=left| 
|align=left|
|-align=center
|Loss
|33-7-1
|align=left| Kubrat Pulev
|UD
|8
|
|align=left| 
|align=left|
|-align=center
|Win
|33-6-1
|align=left| Terrell Nelson
|RTD
|7 
|
|align=left| 
|align=left|
|-align=center
|Win
|32-6-1
|align=left| Charles Davis
|UD
|6
|
|align=left| 
|align=left|
|-align=center
|Win
|31-6-1
|align=left| Johnnie White
|TKO
|1 
|
|align=left| 
|align=left|
|-align=center
|Win
|30-6-1
|align=left| Gabe Brown
|UD
|8
|
|align=left| 
|align=left|
|-align=center
|Win
|29-6-1
|align=left| Jean François Bergeron
|KO
|2 
|
|align=left| 
|align=left|
|-align=center
|Loss
|28-6-1
|align=left| Robert Hawkins
|UD
|10
|
|align=left| 
|align=left|
|-align=center
|Loss
|28-5-1
|align=left| Eddie Chambers
|UD
|10
|
|align=left| 
|align=left|
|-align=center
|Win
|28-4-1
|align=left| Zuri Lawrence
|TKO
|2 
|
|align=left| 
|align=left|
|-align=center
|Win
|27-4-1
|align=left| Zack Page
|SD
|8
|
|align=left| 
|align=left|
|-align=center
|Loss
|26-4-1
|align=left| Tony Thompson
|UD
|12
|
|align=left| 
|align=left|
|-align=center
|Win
|26-3-1
|align=left| Audley Harrison
|UD
|10
|
|align=left| 
|align=left|
|-align=center
|Loss
|25-3-1
|align=left| James Toney
|UD
|12
|
|align=left| 
|align=left|
|-align=center
|style="background:#abcdef;"|Draw
|25-2-1
|align=left| Friday Ahunanya
|PTS
|10
|
|align=left| 
|align=left|
|-align=center
|Loss
|25–2
|align=left| Siarhei Liakhovich
|UD
|10
|
|align=left| 
|align=left|
|-align=center
|Win
|25–1
|align=left| Phil Jackson
|KO
|1 
|
|align=left| 
|align=left|
|-align=center
|Loss
|24–1
|align=left| Monte Barrett
|SD
|10
|
|align=left| 
|align=left|
|-align=center
|Win
|24–0
|align=left| Derrick Banks
|UD
|10
|
|align=left| 
|align=left|
|-align=center
|Win
|23–0
|align=left| Duncan Dokiwari
|UD
|10
|
|align=left| 
|align=left|
|-align=center
|Win
|22–0
|align=left| Michael Grant
|TKO
|7 
|
|align=left| 
|align=left|
|-align=center
|Win
|21–0
|align=left| Charles Hatcher
|TKO
|9 
|
|align=left| 
|align=left|
|-align=center
|Win
|20–0
|align=left| Otis Tisdale
|UD
|8
|
|align=left| 
|align=left|
|-align=center
|Win
|19–0
|align=left| Garing Lane
|SD
|8
|
|align=left| 
|align=left|
|-align=center
|Win
|18–0
|align=left| Terry McGroom
|TKO
|7 
|
|align=left| 
|align=left|
|-align=center
|Win
|17–0
|align=left| Wade Lewis
|KO
|1 
|
|align=left| 
|align=left|
|-align=center
|Win
|16–0
|align=left| Drexie James
|TKO
|1 
|
|align=left| 
|align=left|
|-align=center
|Win
|15–0
|align=left| Derek Berry
|TKO
|2 
|
|align=left| 
|align=left|
|-align=center
|Win
|14–0
|align=left| Tony LaRosa
|TKO
|1 
|
|align=left| 
|align=left|
|-align=center
|Win
|13–0
|align=left| Antonio Colbert
|UD
|6
|
|align=left| 
|align=left|
|-align=center
|Win
|12–0
|align=left| Todd Diggs
|KO
|1 
|
|align=left| 
|align=left|
|-align=center
|Win
|11–0
|align=left| Maurice Wheeler
|KO
|2 
|
|align=left| 
|align=left|
|-align=center
|Win
|10–0
|align=left| Marvin Hill
|KO
|1 
|
|align=left| 
|align=left|
|-align=center
|Win
|9–0
|align=left| Ronnie Smith
|UD
|6
|
|align=left| 
|align=left|
|-align=center
|Win
|8–0
|align=left| Marvin Hunt
|TKO
|4 
|
|align=left| 
|align=left|
|-align=center
|Win
|7–0
|align=left| Anthony Moore
|UD
|4
|
|align=left| 
|align=left|
|-align=center
|Win
|6–0
|align=left| James Lester
|TKO
|1 
|
|align=left| 
|align=left|
|-align=center
|Win
|5–0
|align=left| Rodney Phillips
|TKO
|1 
|
|align=left| 
|align=left|
|-align=center
|Win
|4–0
|align=left| John Lewis
|TKO
|1 
|
|align=left| 
|align=left|
|-align=center
|Win
|3–0
|align=left| Michael Rothberger
|TKO
|1 
|
|align=left| 
|align=left|
|-align=center
|Win
|2–0
|align=left| Leonard Childs
|TKO
|2 
|
|align=left| 
|align=left|
|-align=center
|Win
|1–0
|align=left| Leroy Hollis
|TKO
|1 
|
|align=left| 
|align=left|
|-align=center

References

External links
 

1975 births
Living people
Boxers from Arkansas
Heavyweight boxers
National Golden Gloves champions
Sportspeople from Hot Springs, Arkansas
Winners of the United States Championship for amateur boxers
American male boxers
Competitors at the 1998 Goodwill Games